Pan-European can refer to:

 Pan-European identity
 Pan-European corridors
 Pan-European Corridor X
 Pan-European Corridor Xa
 Pan European Game Information
 Pan-European Institute
 Pan-European nationalism
 Pan-European Oil Pipeline
 Pan-European Pension
 Pan-European Picnic
 Paneuropean Union, a European unification group
 Pan-European University
 Paneuropean Working Group of the European Parliament
 Honda ST series motorcycles, sold as the Pan-European in the UK & Europe

See also

 European integration
 European political party
 Pro-Europeanism
 
 
 Transeuropean (disambiguation)
 Transeuropa (disambiguation)
 European (disambiguation)
 Pan (disambiguation)
 Proto-Indo-European language